Ilyophis is a genus of eels in the cutthroat eel family Synaphobranchidae.

Species
There are currently six recognized species in this genus:

 Ilyophis arx C. H. Robins, 1976
 Ilyophis blachei Saldanha & Merrett, 1982
 Ilyophis brunneus C. H. Gilbert, 1891 
 Ilyophis nigeli Shcherbachev & Sulak, 1997
 Ilyophis robinsae Sulak & Shcherbachev, 1997
 Ilyophis saldanhai Karmovskaya & Parin, 1999

References

Synaphobranchidae
Ray-finned fish genera